The 2016–17 season was Edinburgh Rugby's sixteenth season competing in the Pro12.

Team

Coaches
Coaches
 Alan Solomons  (Head coach)
 Stevie Scott  (Forwards coach)
 Duncan Hodge (Backs coach)
 Peter Wilkins (Defence coach)

Other coaches
 Marc Keys (Assistant S&C Coach)
 Ben Atiga (Player and Skills Coach)
 Murray Fleming (Lead performance analyst)
 Paul Larter (Performance analyst)

Squad

(c) Denotes team captain, 
Italicised denotes Scottish qualified

Transfers

Personnel In

 Duncan Weir from  Glasgow Warriors
 Rory Scholes from  Ulster
 Glenn Bryce from  Glasgow Warriors
 Junior Rasolea from  Western Force
 Kevin Bryce from  Glasgow Warriors
 Alex Northam from  La Rochelle
 Sasa Tofilau from  Kirkaldy RFC
 Viliami Fihaki from Sale Sharks

Players Out

 Matt Scott to  Gloucester Rugby
 Mike Coman to  London Irish
 Sam Beard to  Newport Gwent Dragons
 Greig Tonks to  London Irish
 John Andress to   Munster

References

2016-17
2016–17 in Scottish rugby union
2016–17 Pro12 by team
2016–17 European Rugby Champions Cup by team